Sargood is a surname. People with the surname include:

 Frederick James Sargood (1805–1873), politician in colonial Victoria, a member of the Legislative Council and Assembly
 Frederick Thomas Sargood (1834–1903), Australian politician, Victorian minister and Australian senator; son of above
 Percy Sargood (1865–1940), New Zealand businessman and philanthropist
 Richard Sargood (1888–1979), British trade unionist and Labour Party politician

See also 
 Allgood (disambiguation)
 Hargood (disambiguation)

English-language surnames
Surnames of English origin
Surnames of British Isles origin